1, or 1: Greatest Hits, is a double studio album by Julio Iglesias, released in 2011 on Sony Music Latin.

The album contains newly recorded versions of selected Julio Iglesias' hits. The overall arrangements of the new recordings are very similar to the originals.

Track listing

Disc 1

Disc 2

Charts

Weekly charts

Year-end charts

Certifications

References

External links
 1: Greatest Hits at AllMusic
 1:  Volume 1 (Brazil) at Discogs
 

2011 albums
Julio Iglesias albums
Sony Music Latin albums